Andiorrhinus is a genus of earthworm in the family Glossoscolecidae. The genus contains 37 species subdivided into four subgenera.

Subdivisions 
Andiorrhinus (Amazonidrilus) Righi, 1993
 Andiorrhinus aberratus Zicsi & Csuzdi, 1999
 Andiorrhinus bolivianus Zicsi, 1995
 Andiorrhinus gavi Righi & Araujo, 2000
 Andiorrhinus motto Righi & Araujo, 1999
 Andiorrhinus rondoniensis Righi, 1986
 Andiorrhinus tukuko Righi, 1996

Andiorrhinus (Andiorrhinus) Cognetti, 1908
 Andiorrhinus amazonius Michaelsen, 1915
 Andiorrhinus baniwa Righi & Nemeth, 1983
 Andiorrhinus bare Righi & Nemeth, 1983
 Andiorrhinus boconius Righi, 1990
 Andiorrhinus brunneus (Michaelsen, 1892)
 Andiorrhinus bucki Righi, 1986
 Andiorrhinus caudatus Righi & Ayres & Bittencourt, 1976
 Andiorrhinus duidanus Michaelsen, 1936
 Andiorrhinus evelineae Righi, 1986
 Andiorrhinus holmgreni Michaelsen, 1917
 Andiorrhinus kuika Righi, 1993
 Andiorrhinus kuru Moreno & Paoletti, 2004   
 Andiorrhinus mandauaka Righi & Nemeth, 1983
 Andiorrhinus marcuzzii Omodeo, 1954
 Andiorrhinus meansi James, 2009
 Andiorrhinus montanus Zicsi, 1995
 Andiorrhinus muku Righi, 1989
 Andiorrhinus mukuci Righi, 1993
 Andiorrhinus paraguayensis  (Rosa, 1895) 
 Andiorrhinus pauate Righi, 1986
 Andiorrhinus pictus Michaelsen, 1925 
 Andiorrhinus planaria Michaelsen, 1934 
 Andiorrhinus proboscideus Cernosvitov, 1939 
 Andiorrhinus rubescens Michaelsen, 1925 
 Andiorrhinus salvadorii Cognetti, 1908 
 Andiorrhinus venezuelanus (Cognetti, 1907)

Andiorrhinus (Meridrilus) Righi, 1993
 Andiorrhinus guamo (Righi, 1990)
 Andiorrhinus rimeda Righi & Araujo, 2000

Andiorrhinus (Turedrilus) Righi, 1993
 Andiorrhinus acaciascensis Feijoo, 2008
 Andiorrhinus royeroi Drachenberg, 1991 
 Andiorrhinus samuelensis Righi, 1986

References

Haplotaxida
Animals described in 1908